Moonan Brook, a mostly perennial stream of the Hunter River catchment, is located in the Hunter region of New South Wales, Australia.

Course
Officially designated as a river, the Moonan Brook rises below Mount Barrington on the western slopes of Mount Royal Range. Moonan Brook descends  over its  course.

See also

 List of rivers of Australia
 List of rivers of New South Wales (L-Z)
 Rivers of New South Wales

References

External links
 

 

Rivers of the Hunter Region
Upper Hunter Shire
Hunter River (New South Wales)